This is a list of 100 species in Polymerus, a genus of plant bugs in the family Miridae.

Polymerus species

 Polymerus amazonicus Carvalho, 1976 c g
 Polymerus americanus (Reuter, 1876) i c g
 Polymerus amurensis Kerzhner, 1988 c g
 Polymerus andinus Carvalho and Carpintero, 1989 c g
 Polymerus aristeae Ferreira, 1979 c g
 Polymerus asperulae (Fieber, 1861) c g
 Polymerus atacamensis Carvalho and Carpintero, 1986 c g
 Polymerus aureus (Ballard, 1927) c g
 Polymerus balli Knight, 1925 i c g
 Polymerus basalis (Reuter, 1876) i c g b  (red-spotted aster mirid)
 Polymerus basivittis (Reuter, 1909) i c g
 Polymerus bimaculatus (Poppius, 1910) c g
 Polymerus brevicornis (Reuter, 1879) c g
 Polymerus brevirostris Knight, 1925 i c g
 Polymerus brevis Knight, 1925 i c g
 Polymerus caligatus (Stål, 1860) c g
 Polymerus carpathicus (Horvath, 1882) c g
 Polymerus carpinteroi Carvalho and Wallerstein, 1978 c g
 Polymerus castilleja Schwartz, 1989 i c g
 Polymerus chilensis Carvalho and Gomes, 1969 c g
 Polymerus chrysopsis Knight, 1925 i c g
 Polymerus coccineus (Spinola, 1852) c g
 Polymerus cognatus (Fieber, 1858) i c g
 Polymerus consanguineus (Distant, 1904) c g
 Polymerus costalis Knight, 1943 i c g
 Polymerus cunealis (Reuter, 1907) c
 Polymerus cuneatus (Distant, 1893) c
 Polymerus delongi Knight, 1925 i c g
 Polymerus diffusus (Uhler, 1872) i c g
 Polymerus dissimilis (Reuter, 1896) c g
 Polymerus ecuadorense Carvalho and Gomes, 1968 c g
 Polymerus elegans (Reuter, 1909) i c g
 Polymerus fasciolus Knight, 1943 i c g
 Polymerus flaviloris Knight, 1925 i c g
 Polymerus flavipes (Distant, 1904) c g
 Polymerus flavocostatus Knight, 1926 i c g
 Polymerus forughae Linnavuori and Hosseini, 2000 c g
 Polymerus froeschneri Knight, 1923 i c g
 Polymerus fulvipes Knight, 1923 i c g b
 Polymerus funestus (Reuter, 1906) c g
 Polymerus gerhardi Knight, 1923 i c g
 Polymerus gracilentus Knight, 1925 i c g
 Polymerus hirtulus Wagner, 1959 c g
 Polymerus hirtus Knight, 1943 i c g
 Polymerus holosericeus Hahn, 1831 i c g
 Polymerus illini Knight, 1941 i c g
 Polymerus lammesi Rinne, 1989 c g
 Polymerus lanuginosus (Distant, 1893) c
 Polymerus longirostris (Reuter, 1905) c g
 Polymerus madagascariensis (Poppius, 1914) c g
 Polymerus microphthalmus (Wagner, 1951) c g
 Polymerus minutus Ferreira, 1979 c g
 Polymerus modestus (Blanchard, 1852) c g
 Polymerus nigrigulis Knight, 1926 i c g
 Polymerus nigritus (Fallén, 1807) c g
 Polymerus nigropallidus Knight, 1923 i c g
 Polymerus nitidus (Odhiambo, 1960) c g
 Polymerus nubilipes Knight, 1925 i c g
 Polymerus obscuratus (Poppius, 1914) c g
 Polymerus ocellatus (V. Signoret, 1864) c g
 Polymerus opacus Knight, 1923 i c g b
 Polymerus ornatifrons Odhiambo, 1959 c g
 Polymerus pallescens (Walker, 1873) i c g
 Polymerus pallidus Maldonado, 1969 c g
 Polymerus palustris (Reuter, 1905) c g
 Polymerus pekinensis Horváth, 1901 c g
 Polymerus peruanus Carvalho and Melendez, 1986 c g
 Polymerus proximus Knight, 1923 i c g b
 Polymerus punctipes Knight, 1923 i c g
 Polymerus relativus Knight, 1926 i c g
 Polymerus robustus Henry, 1978 i c g
 Polymerus rostratus T. Henry, 1978 c g
 Polymerus rubescens Carvalho and Schaffner, 1973 c g
 Polymerus rubidus (Reuter, 1896) c g
 Polymerus rubrocuneatus Knight, 1925 i c g b  (red-cuneus plant bug)
 Polymerus rubroornatus Knight, 1926 c g
 Polymerus rufipes Knight, 1926 i c g
 Polymerus rugulus (Ballard, 1927) c g
 Polymerus sculleni Knight, 1943 i c g
 Polymerus severini Knight, 1925 i c g
 Polymerus shawi Knight, 1943 i c g
 Polymerus solitus (Walker, 1873) c g
 Polymerus standishi Knight, 1943 i c g
 Polymerus sticticus (Stål, 1860) c g
 Polymerus tepastus Rinne, 1989 c g
 Polymerus testaceipes (Stål, 1860) i c g b
 Polymerus tinctipes Knight, 1923 i c g
 Polymerus tomentosus Villers, 1789 c g
 Polymerus tumidifrons Knight, 1925 i c g
 Polymerus uhleri (Van Duzee, 1914) i c g
 Polymerus unifasciatus (Fabricius, 1794) i c g b
 Polymerus vegatus (Van Duzee, 1933) c g
 Polymerus venaticus (Uhler, 1872) i c g b
 Polymerus venestus  b
 Polymerus venustus Knight, 1923 i c g
 Polymerus vittatipennis Knight, 1943 i c g
 Polymerus voelzkovi (Reuter, 1907) c g
 Polymerus vulneratus (Wolff, 1801) i c g
 Polymerus wheeleri Henry, 1979 i c g
 Polymerus xerophilus Linnavuori, 1975 c g

Data sources: i = ITIS, c = Catalogue of Life, g = GBIF, b = Bugguide.net

References

Polymerus